Preben Hoch (10 December 1925 – July 2014) was a Danish rower. He competed in the men's eight event at the 1952 Summer Olympics.

References

1925 births
2014 deaths
Danish male rowers
Olympic rowers of Denmark
Rowers at the 1952 Summer Olympics